Powerlifting has been part of every World Games  since the inaugural 1981 World Games held in Santa Clara, California.

Medalists

Men

Lightweight

Middleweight

Heavyweight

Super Heavyweight

−52 kg

−56 kg

−60 kg

−75 kg

−82,5 kg

−90 kg

−100 kg

−110 kg

+110 kg

Women

Lightweight

Middleweight

Heavyweight

Super Heavyweight

External links
 Results of World Championships at IPF

 
Sports at the World Games
World Games